Evfimija Vladimirovna, known as Euphemia of Kiev ( 1112–died 4 April 1139) was Queen Consort of Hungary by marriage to Coloman, King of Hungary.

Euphemia was the daughter of Grand Prince Vladimir II of Kiev and his second wife, whose name and ancestry are unknown. She was married to King Coloman of Hungary around 1112. However, her husband, who had been suffering from a serious disease, caught her in adultery and immediately sent her back to Kiev. Euphemia gave birth to her son, Boris (1113 – 1155–1156), in her father's court, but the son was never recognised by King Coloman. Afterwards, she lived in a monastery near Kiev till her death.

Sources
 Soltész, István: Árpád-házi királynék (Gabo, 1999)
 Kristó, Gyula – Makk, Ferenc: Az Árpád-ház uralkodói (IPC Könyvek, 1996)

References

Hungarian queens consort
1139 deaths
Kievan Rus' princesses
Hungarian people of Ukrainian descent
Year of birth unknown
Burials at the Church of the Saviour at Berestove
12th-century Rus' people
12th-century Rus' women
12th-century Hungarian people
12th-century Hungarian women